George Clanton (also known by the monikers Mirror Kisses, ESPRIT 空想, and Kid's Garden) is an American electronic musician and singer-songwriter known for his involvement with the vaporwave music scene. He established his independent record label 100% Electronica in 2015, and in 2019 launched the first vaporwave music festival, 100% ElectroniCON.

Biography
George Clanton was born in Ridgeway, Virginia. He grew up going to punk rock shows. His career began when he accidentally downloaded a misnamed Brian Jonestown Massacre song, which led him down an Internet rabbit hole where he discovered "a whole new world of music" which inspired him to write and release his own under the pseudonym Mirror Kisses, and later ESPRIT 空想 (“fantasy” in Chinese). He decided to start using his real name before releasing his album 100% Electronica, because "[he] didn't want to release one more album as Mirror Kisses", and he "hated saying 'Mirror Kisses' every time someone asked [him his] band name." He tried to make a sequel to 100% Electronica for three years but felt that he failed, because he wasn't able to find the sound he wanted for it. After giving up, he started experimenting and writing stuff for fun and felt that the "songs [were writing] themselves". Eventually, this material transformed into his next album, Slide, where he incorporated electric guitar and acoustic drums as well.

In 2015 he established his record label 100% Electronica along with his girlfriend, fellow musical artist Negative Gemini. He and Negative Gemini both hail from Virginia and played their first show together in 2011 along with other artists such as Skylar Spence. In 2019, they launched 100% Electronicon, the first vaporwave music festival.

Clanton streams his live performances regularly on Twitch and YouTube. He described New York City as his favorite city in the world to perform.

Clanton has a degree in anthropology and taught himself computer programming in order to create virtual interactive experiences for his record label.

Songwriting and style
George Clanton's music has been described as a fusion of electropop, trip hop, and vaporwave, while also using elements of baggy, grunge, acid house, and shoegaze. Critics have also associated his music with chillwave and hypnagogic pop. Clanton noted that unlike some vaporwave artists, he does not try to be "ironic" or "silly with his lyrics", and prefers to "write great pop songs that are representative of an emotion that [he] actually [feels] when [he's] singing them." He described his album Slide as a "vaporwave opera". When he finds a sound that he likes, he uses it as often as he can, believing it helps him make his albums sound more cohesive and iconic. Clanton's aim for his music is to evoke "nostalgia". When he starts writing a song, he randomly presses notes on his keyboard instrument and cycles through patches and effects until they trigger emotions and memories on him.

Although he is frequently associated with vaporwave, Clanton himself states that he embraces the tag purely for marketing purposes, and does not consider himself strictly a vaporwave musician. Vaporwave is primarily an instrumental genre, which contradicts Clanton's use of vocals. His only conscious attempt at the genre was with the ESPRIT 空想 sideproject.

Influences
George Clanton's influences include Seal, Anton Newcombe, The Prodigy, New Order, and 311, which was the first band he saw live. Clanton collaborated with 311's Nick Hexum on several songs which they released in 2019, as well as a full album in 2020.

Discography

As George Clanton
 100% Electronica (2015)
 Slide (2018)
 George Clanton & Nick Hexum (2020; collaborative album with Nick Hexum)

As Mirror Kisses
 Soaking Wet (2008)
 Dance Decree / Light Hearted (2009)
 Bad Dreams (2012)
 Heartbeats (2013)

As ESPRIT 空想
 「Girls Only」 (EP; 2012)
 Summer Night (EP; 2013)
 Relax™ (2013)
 Virtua.zip (2014)
 200% Electronica (2017)

As Kid's Garden 

 Further (2007)
 Lord, Amen (2009)
 Don't Call Me Yours (2011)
 DARLING (2014)

References

External links
 

American electronic musicians
Record producers from Virginia
Vaporwave musicians
Living people
21st-century American singers
American male singer-songwriters
American synth-pop musicians
Chillwave musicians
Trip hop musicians
Hypnagogic pop musicians
American singer-songwriters
1988 births